The 2013–14 Arizona Wildcats women's basketball team represented the University of Arizona during the 2013–14 NCAA Division I women's basketball season. The Wildcats, led by sixth year head coach Niya Butts, played their games at the McKale Center and are members of the Pac-12 Conference. They finished with a record of 5–25 overall, 1–17 in Pac-12 play. They lost in the first round of the 2014 Pac-12 Conference women's basketball tournament to USC.

Roster

Schedule

|-
!colspan=9 |Exitbition

|-
!colspan=9 | Regular Season

|-
!colspan=9| 2014 Pac-12 Tournament

See also
 2013–14 Arizona Wildcats men's basketball team

References

Arizona Wildcats women's basketball seasons
Arizona
Arizona Wildcats
Arizona Wildcats